Ďáblice cemetery is a graveyard in Ďáblice municipal district, Prague. The entrance pavilions were designed by Vlastislav Hofman.

The cemetery was opened in 1914 and over 20,000 registered graves are located here. As well as single and family graves there are about 70  mass graves containing bodies of over 14,000 people in total. Since 1943, Czech people executed by Nazis or killed while fighting Nazis were buried there; since 1945 executed Nazi criminals and since 1948 people who were executed or died in communist prisons. In 2014 the body of P. Josef Toufar was identified and exhumed from one of the mass graves in the course of his beatification. There is serious intention to declare this part of the cemetery a national monument. This initiative is hampered by the objection that, apart from thousands of the victims of Nazism and hundreds of the victims of communism, the mass graves also contain thousands of bodies or body parts of unknown people who died in Prague hospitals and were subsequently used for pathological or academic autopsies.

The bodies of Jan Kubiš and Jozef Gabčík, the assassins of Reinhard Heydrich in 1942, were secretly buried in a mass grave in this cemetery after being killed by Nazi German troops. In 2014 there were calls for their remains to be removed from the cemetery and be given a dignified burial fitting "the heroes of anti-Nazi resistance". Also buried in an anonymous pit at Ďáblice is Nazi war criminal Karl Hermann Frank, buried after his hanging in 1946.

References

External links
 

Cemeteries in Prague
20th-century establishments in Bohemia
1914 establishments in Austria-Hungary